Dieter Rübsaamen ( 24 August 1937 in Wiesbaden) is a German painter.

Biography
Born in Wiesbaden in 1937, raised in Maxsain (Westerwald); law studies; has worked as an artist since 1957, autodidact. About 100 exhibitions in Germany and abroad since 1962. Art scholarship of the City of Bonn in 1990. August Macke Laureate of the City of Bonn in 2008. Works in numerous collections. Lives in Bonn.

External links

Gudrun von Schoenebeck: Suche nach Unsichtbarem - Bilder stecken voller Zitate, Anspielungen und Zeichen - Sie beziehen sich auf Literatur, Philosophie und Wissenschaft
Exhibition for the 70th birthday of Dieter Rübsaamen
Homepage of Dieter Rübsaamen

20th-century German painters
20th-century German male artists
German male painters
21st-century German painters
21st-century German male artists
1937 births
Living people